Pseudorasbora is a genus of small freshwater fish native to eastern Asia, including China, Korea, Japan and Siberia. P. parva, has been introduced to regions outside its native range and is considered invasive.

Species
There are currently 5 recognized species in this genus:
 Pseudorasbora elongata H. W. Wu, 1939
 Pseudorasbora interrupta Z. Xiao, Z. H. Lan & X. L. Chen, 2007
 Pseudorasbora parva Temminck & Schlegel, 1846 (Stone moroko, topmouth gudgeon)
 Pseudorasbora pugnax Kawase & Hosoya, 2015
 Pseudorasbora pumila Miyadi, 1930

References

 
Cyprinidae genera
Cyprinid fish of Asia
Taxa named by Pieter Bleeker